Sara Lunden (performing name Saralunden) (born March 30, 1970 in Gothenburg, Sweden) is a singer, musician and performance artist. She started out making music and performances around 1997 during her art studies at Royal College University of Fine Arts Stockholm where she received an MFA. Since the late 90s she's been developing her own personal musical style mixing influences from disco, schlager, chanson, electronica and minimal wave. Her live performances often involves theatrical costumes and live musicians i.e. ”Deadly Boring” where a men's choir, adds a background for her vocals.

Notable performances

 (1997) The Tallest Woman, Royal Academy of Fine Arts. Stockholm
 (1998) Saralunden - The Famous, The Art Brothel, Stockholm
 (1999) Lonely Hearts in the Crowd, Ynglingagatan 1, Stockholm
 (2000) Deadly Boring, Stockholm Art Fair
 (2000) Finalen Galleri Mejan, Stockholm
 (2003) I Took Hormones to Become a Man, Kunsthalle Tallinn & Kulturhuset Stockholm
 (2003) Into Your Head, SOC, Stockholm 
 (2004) Great Space, Atalante Gothenburg
 (2004) There Was a Time When Everything Was Alright, Röda Sten, Gothenburg
 (2004) If Anyone Tried Hard Enough, Kilen, Kulturhuset Stockholm 
 (2005) Performance, Moderna Museet, Stockholm
 (2006) Das Fleck, Dot Dot Dot Dot, Mossutställningar, Stockholm
 (2006) Sven-Göran Eriksson vs. Phil Spector: Songs of the Freak, Liste Art Fair Basel
 (2007) Drei Liede Für Ein Gehirn, Lilith Performance Studio, Malmö, Sweden.

Discography
 (1998) Surrounded By Men Yet Without them, CD-R
 (2000) Turn Me Over To The Devil, 7" vinyl, Make it happen MKTH-08
 (2001) All Songs Are Sad Songs, CD compilation, Make it happen MKTH-11
 (2003) This Is Not Desire, CD single featuring Tobias Bernstrup Lobotom Records, LOBOTOM03
 (2003) I Will Sun And Spring You Down, CD, Lobotom Records, LOBOTOM06
 (2006) Sweet Sweet Sweet the Beat, CD, Lobotom Records, LOBOTOM22

Filmography
 (1997) Ist das ein Kind?, Super8/Beta
 (1999) Harlem, musical, Super8/Beta, in collaboration with Henry Moore Selder
 (2001) Deadly Boring, musical, 35mm, in collaboration with Henry Moore Selder
 (2002) Hon är död, musical, 35mm B/W, in collaboration with Henry Moore Selder

References

External links
 The Official Saralunden Web Site

1970 births
Living people
Swedish women musicians
Swedish performance artists